The 2021–22 Old Dominion Monarchs women’s basketball team represents Old Dominion University during the 2021–22 NCAA Division I women's basketball season. The team is led by second-year head coach DeLisha Milton-Jones, and plays their home games at the Chartway Arena in Norfolk, Virginia as a member of Conference USA.

On October 27, 2021, Old Dominion announced that this will be the last season for the team in the C-USA and become the Sun Belt Conference on July 1, 2022.

Schedule and results

|-
!colspan=12 style=|Exhibition

|-
!colspan=12 style=|Non-conference regular season

|-
!colspan=12 style=|C-USA regular season

|-
!colspan=12 style=| C-USA Tournament

|-
!colspan=12 style=| WNIT

See also
 2021–22 Old Dominion Monarchs men's basketball team

Notes

References

Old Dominion Monarchs women's basketball seasons
Old Dominion Lady Monarchs
Old Dominion Lady Monarchs basketball
Old Dominion Lady Monarchs basketball
Old Dominion